Haos In Laos was a Macedonian New Wave music and pop-rock band from Skopje, SR Macedonia from 1984–1987. Its frontman Risto Samardžiev, formerly a vocalist of the band Cilindar, later started a successful solo career as a pop singer, while its drummer Borjan Jovanovski, later became a prominent journalist in the Republic of Macedonia, specialized on EU issues, a correspondent of Voice of America from Skopje and a spokesman of the former President of the Republic of Macedonia Boris Trajkovski.
The guitarist of the Haos In Laos was Zlatan Milivojevic.

Songs
Haos In Laos - songs:
Ne sakam mrak - I don't like darkness
Lugje kukli - People puppets
Pesna za vilata - The fairy song
Na krajot od gradot - At the end of the city
Bidi mi se - Be my everything
Suze - Tears
Zasekogaš del - Forever a part

See also
Music of the Republic of Macedonia
SFR Yugoslav pop and rock scene

Macedonian musical groups

References